The 1878 New Ross by-election was fought on 17 December 1878.  The byelection was fought due to the death of the incumbent Home Rule MP, John Dunbar.  It was won by the Conservative candidate Charles George Tottenham.

References

New Ross
1878 elections in the United Kingdom
By-elections to the Parliament of the United Kingdom in County Wexford constituencies
1878 elections in Ireland